Chinese Cubans are Cubans of full or mixed Chinese ancestry who were born in or have immigrated to Cuba. They are part of the ethnic Chinese diaspora (or Overseas Chinese).

History

Chinese immigration to Cuba started in 1837 when Chinese (Cantonese and Hakka) contract workers were brought to work in the sugar fields, bringing the religion of Buddhism with them. Hundreds of thousands of Chinese workers were brought in from mainland China, Hong Kong, Macau, and Taiwan during the following decades to replace and/or work alongside African and mixed-ancestry or free slaves. After completing eight-year contracts or otherwise obtaining their freedom, some Chinese immigrants  settled permanently in Cuba, although most longed for repatriation to their homeland. Havana's Chinatown (known as Barrio Chino de La Habana) is one of the oldest and largest Chinatowns in Latin America. Some 105,000 immigrants from the U.S. came to Cuba during the late 19th century to escape the discrimination present at the time. Another, albeit smaller wave of Chinese immigrants, also arrived during the 20th century, some as supporters of the communist cause during the Cuban revolution and others as dissidents escaping the authorities in China.

There were almost no women among the nearly entirely male Chinese "coolie" population that migrated to Cuba (1%). In Cuba, some Indian (Native American), mulatto, black and white women engaged in sexual relations or marriages with Chinese men, with marriages of mulatto, black and white women being reported by the Cuba Commission Report.

In the 1920s, an additional 30,000 Cantonese and small groups of Japanese also arrived; both immigrations were exclusively male and there was rapid intermarriage with white, black and mulato populations. CIA World Factbook. Cuba. 2008. May 15, 2008. claimed 114,240 Chinese-Cuban coolies with only 300 pure Chinese.

In a study of genetic origins, admixture, and asymmetry in maternal and paternal human lineages in Cuba, thirty-five Y-chromosome SNPs were typed in the 132 male individuals of the Cuban sample. The study does not include any people with known Chinese ancestry. All the samples were white Cubans and black Cubans. Two out of 132 male samples belonged to East Asian haplogroup O2, which is found in significant frequencies among Cantonese people and is found in 1.5% of the Cuban population. In the 1920s, an additional 30,000 Chinese  arrived; the immigrants were exclusively male. In 1980, 4000 Chinese lived there, but by 2002, only 300 pure Chinese were left.

Two thousand Chinese, consisting of Cantonese and Hakkas, fought with the rebels in Cuba's Ten Years' War. A monument in Havana honours the Cuban Chinese who fell in the war,  on which is inscribed: "There was not one Cuban Chinese deserter, not one Cuban Chinese traitor."

Chinese Cubans, including some Chinese Americans from California, joined the Spanish–American War in 1898 to achieve independence from Spain, but a few Chinese, who were loyal to Spain, left Cuba and went to Spain. Racial acceptance and assimilation would come much later.

When the new revolutionary government led by Fidel Castro came to power in 1959, the economic and political situation changed. Many Chinese grocery store owners, having had their properties expropriated by the new government, left Cuba. Most of these settled in the United States, particularly nearby Florida, where they and their U.S.-born children are called Chinese Americans or Cuban Americans of Chinese descent, while a relatively few fled to the nearby Dominican Republic and other Latin American countries and also to the U.S. territory of Puerto Rico, where they are called Chinese Puerto Ricans, Cuban-Puerto Ricans of Chinese descent or Cuban-Americans of Chinese descent number in hundreds  thousands. Chinese refugees to United States include people whose ancestors came to Cuba ten years before the Cuban Revolution and those from the United States. As a result of this exodus, the number of pure Chinese dropped sharply in Havana's Barrio Chino. The places to which they migrated had a unique Chinese culture and a popularity of Chinese Cuban restaurants.

Current distribution

The Chinese Cubans fought in the Cuban war of independence on the side of those seeking independence from Spain. A memorial consisting of a broken column memorializes Chinese participation in the war of independence at the corners of L and Linea in Havana. While many fled, some Chinese stayed after the start of Fidel Castro's rule in 1961. Younger generations are working in a wider variety of jobs than the previous generation. Many are entering show-business as song composers, actors, actresses, singers and models.

The Barrio Chino de La Habana is no longer among the largest Chinatowns in Latin America. Most Chinese Cubans live outside Barrio Chino.

Several community groups, especially Chinatown Promotional Group (Spanish: Grupo Promotor del Barrio Chino), worked to revive Barrio Chino and the faded Chinese culture. Chinese Language and Arts School (Escuela de la Lengua y Artes China) opened in 1993 and has grown since then, helping Chinese Cubans to strengthen their knowledge of the Chinese language. Today, Chinese Cubans tend to speak Mandarin, Cantonese, and Hakka in addition to Spanish and English and may speak in a mixture of Chinese and Spanish. They also promoted small businesses, like beauty parlors, mechanical shops, restaurants and small groceries, provided to them to create a view of Barrio Chino. Havana's Barrio Chino also experienced buildings of Chinese architecture and museum with backgrounds about China. As a result, the Chinese Cuban community has gained visibility.

In literature and popular culture
 The influence of the Chinese migration to Cuba is thoroughly reflected in the novel The Island of Eternal Love by Cuban American author Daína Chaviano. Originally published in Spain as La isla de los amores infinitos, it has been translated into 25 languages. The plot covers 150 years, from the 1840s through the 1990s.
 A Cuban Chinese family engaged in international intrigue appears in William Gibson's Spook Country (2007).
 In the 2006 film Miami Vice, Gong Li portrays Isabella, a Chinese Cuban woman.

Notable Chinese Cubans
Fulgencio Batista, former president of Cuba
Alfredo Abon Lee, commander of the pro-government forces during the Battle of Yaguajay
Wifredo Lam, a painter of the Surrealist school
Maikel Chang, professional association football (soccer) player
Yat-Sen Chang, ballet dancer
Lyen Wong, fitness athlete
Anacaona, a pioneer of son music

See also

 Asian Hispanic and Latino Americans
 Asian Latin Americans
 China–Cuba relations
 Chinatowns in Latin America
 Chinese Caribbeans
 Cubans
 Overseas Chinese

References

Further reading 
 Hu-DeHart, Evelyn, and Kathleen López. "Asian Diasporas in Latin America and the Caribbean: An Historical Overview." Afro-Hispanic Review (2008): 9-21. in JSTOR
 
 
 López, Kathleen M. Chinese Cubans: A Transnational History (2013)

López-Calvo, Ignacio.  “Chinesism and the commodification of Chinese Cuban culture.” Alternative Orientalisms in Latin America and Beyond. Ed. Ignacio López-Calvo. Newcastle, England: Cambridge Scholars Publishing, 2007. 95-112.
 Meagher, Arnold J. The Coolie trade: the traffic in Chinese laborers to Latin America 1847-1874 (2008).
 Young, Elliott. Alien Nation: Chinese Migration in the Americas from the Coolie Era Through World War II (2014).
 Yun, Lisa. The Coolie Speaks: Chinese Indentured Laborers and African Slaves in Cuba (2008)

 
Asian Cuban
Chinese Caribbean
Cuban
Chinese Latin American
Society of Cuba
Ethnic groups in Cuba